"Ich tu dir weh" (German for "I'm hurting you") is a song by the German Neue Deutsche Härte band Rammstein. It was the second single released from their sixth studio album, Liebe ist für alle da (2009), on 5 February 2010. A music video for the song had previously been released online on 21 December 2009.

The song contains controversial lyrics surrounding sadomasochism. Because of this, Liebe ist für alle da was placed on the "index" maintained by the German BPjM, leading to a forced censored re-release of the album. In May 2010, the original uncensored album and the single were de-indexed and consequently released in Germany.

Music video 
The music video for the song was released online on 21 December 2009, hosted on the adult site visit-X. It was directed by Jonas Åkerlund and shows the band performing the song with equipment that has black and gray colors. Both Till Lindemann and Oliver Riedel are wearing eye contacts that eventually turn colors (Riedel's turn green and Lindemann's turn red). Lindemann's mouth also emits a white light when he sings. A cable runs through his cheek and a light is mounted inside his mouth. Lindemann wanted the effect to be authentic, so he had his cheek pierced just for the production. At the climax of the video, the stage around Flake fills with electricity, resulting in the band members exploding at the last note.

Live performances
When played live, large quantities of pyrotechnics are used during "Ich tu dir weh". A choreographed fight takes place mid-song between Lindemann and Flake, which ends with Flake being forced into a large bathtub. Lindemann proceeds to stand on a platform that raises him high above the bathtub, from which he pours a large amount of sparks from a milk can into the bath below. This causes multiple large explosions, after which Flake emerges wearing a silver holographic suit. In the first few German concerts of the Liebe ist für alle da tour, they modified the song's lyrics to allow Lindemann to sing them, because the original lyrics were tagged as inappropriate by the Bundesprüfstelle für jugendgefährdende Medien.

Track listing 
All songs written by Rammstein.

Limited CD single

 "Ich tu dir weh (Radio Edit)" – 3:57
 "Pussy (Lick It Remix)" by Scooter – 4:54
 "Rammlied (Rammin' the Steins Remix)" by Devin Townsend – 5:09
 "Ich tu dir weh (Smallboy Remix)" by Jochen Schmalbach – 6:42

12" vinyl single

 "Ich tu dir weh (Radio Edit)" – 3:57
 "Ich tu dir weh (Fukkk Offf Remix)" – 6:07
The European edition is pressed on black vinyl, the UK edition on white vinyl.

7" single-sided etched vinyl single

 "Ich tu dir weh (Radio Edit)" – 3:57
The European edition is pressed on black vinyl, the UK edition on red vinyl.

Digital download EP
 "Ich tu dir weh" (Radio Edit) – 3:57
 "Pussy (Lick It Remix)" by Scooter – 4:54
 "Rammlied (Rammin' the Steins Remix)" by Devin Townsend – 5:09
 "Ich tu dir weh (Smallboy Remix)" by Jochen Schmalbach – 6:42
 "Ich tu dir weh (Fukkk Offf Remix)" – 6:07
 Includes digital booklet

Charts

References 

2010 singles
Rammstein songs
Universal Music Group singles
Spinefarm Records singles
Songs about BDSM
Music videos directed by Jonas Åkerlund
Songs written by Richard Z. Kruspe
Songs written by Paul Landers
Songs written by Till Lindemann
Songs written by Christian Lorenz
Songs written by Oliver Riedel
Songs written by Christoph Schneider
2009 songs
Obscenity controversies in music